The Vic bombing was an attack carried out by the Basque separatist group ETA which occurred on 29 May 1991 when a car bomb carrying more than 200 kg of explosive was detonated inside the courtyard of a Civil Guard barracks in the Catalan city of Vic, Spain. The bombing killed 10 people, including five children, and injured 44 people.

Following the selection of Barcelona as the host of the 1992 Olympic Games, ETA launched a series of attacks in Catalonia to gain worldwide attention. Five months earlier, six police officers had been killed in a bomb attack in the city of Sabadell.

The day after the bombing, two members of the ETA cell which carried out the attack were killed by the Civil Guard in a raid on a house at Lliçà d'Amunt, in Province of Barcelona. Five members of ETA were also arrested.

References

 
1991 in Catalonia
1991 murders in Spain
20th-century mass murder in Spain
Attacks on buildings and structures in 1991
Attacks on military installations in the 1990s
Car and truck bombings in Spain
ETA (separatist group) actions
Explosions in Catalonia
Improvised explosive device bombings in 1991 
Mass murder in 1991
Mass murder in Catalonia
May 1991 crimes
May 1991 events in Europe
Terrorist incidents in Catalonia
Terrorist incidents in Spain in 1991
Building bombings in Spain
Vic